Mykhailo Mykolayovych Papiyev (born 1 October 1960, Zaporizhia, Ukrainian SSR, Soviet Union) is a Ukrainian engineer and later politician, member of the Verkhovna Rada (Ukraine's national parliament).

In 1990-1997 he worked as a director for various science and production companies. Papiyev has a degree in physics from the Chernivtsi State University and a PhD in economics.

In 2002-2003 Papiyev was a member of the Verkhovna Rada representing the Social Democratic Party of Ukraine (united).

In 2002-2005 he served as a Minister of Labor and Social Policy of Ukraine.

After failing to become elected to Verkhovna Rada in the 2006 Ukrainian parliamentary election with Opposition Bloc "Ne Tak", in 2006-2007 Papiyev served again as a Minister of Labor and Social Policy of Ukraine.

In from the 2007 Ukrainian parliamentary election until 2010 he again became a member of the Verkhovna Rada representing the Party of Regions.

In 2010-2014 Papiyev served as a Governor of Chernivtsi Oblast.

In the 2014 Ukrainian  parliamentary election he again was reelected to Verkhovna Rada as a member of Opposition Bloc.

In the 2019 Ukrainian  parliamentary election he again was reelected to Verkhovna Rada as a member of Opposition Platform — For Life.

References

External links
 
 Profile at the Official Ukraine Today portal

1960 births
Living people
Politicians from Zaporizhzhia
Chernivtsi University alumni
21st-century Ukrainian engineers
Governors of Chernivtsi Oblast
Fourth convocation members of the Verkhovna Rada
Sixth convocation members of the Verkhovna Rada
Eighth convocation members of the Verkhovna Rada
Ninth convocation members of the Verkhovna Rada
Labor and social policy ministers of Ukraine
Social Democratic Party of Ukraine (united) politicians
Party of Regions politicians
Businesspeople from Zaporizhzhia